Tuke may refer to:

People
 Tuke family, a Quaker family from York, England
 Blair Tuke (born 1989), New Zealand Olympic sailor
 Daniel Hack Tuke (1827–1895), a prominent campaigner for humane treatment of the insane
 Henry Tuke (1755–1814)
 Henry Scott Tuke (1858–1929), British painter and photographer
 James Hack Tuke (1819–1896)
 Margaret Tuke (1862–1947), Principal of Bedford College, London University
 Samuel Tuke (reformer) (1784–1857)
 William Tuke III (1732–1822), founder of The Retreat at York
 William Murray Tuke (1822–1903), tea merchant and banker, son of Samuel Tuke, father of W. F. Tuke
 Anthony Tuke (1920–2001), chairman of Barclays Bank and Rio Tinto Zinc, son of A. W. Tuke, grandson of W. F. Tuke
 Anthony Tuke (1897–1975), chairman of Barclays Bank, son of W. F. Tuke, father of Sir A. F. Tuke
 Benjamin Tuke (1870–1936), Ireland international rugby player
 Bob Tuke (born 1947), American politician
 Brian Tuke (died 1545), secretary of Henry VIII and Cardinal Wolsey
 Charles Tuke (architect) (1843–1893), architect
 John Batty Tuke (1835–1913), Scottish psychiatrist
 Sir Samuel Tuke, 1st Baronet (c. 1615–1674), English Royalist officer, playwright and nobleman
 Thomas Tuke (c. 1580–1657), English clergyman and controversial writer
 Thomas Harrington Tuke (1826–1888), British physician who specialised in psychiatry
 W. F. Tuke (1863–1940), chairman of Barclays Bank

Other uses
 Tuke baronets, a title in the Baronetage of England
 Tuke River, a river in New Zealand
 Technical University of Košice, a college in Slovakia
 Tuke, what the Dani people call the plant Karuka
 Tuke, a character from Disney's Brother Bear

See also
 Took, a surname
 Tooke, a surname
 Tuque, a knit cap
 Tukey (disambiguation)